The year 2020 is the 8th year in the history of the Absolute Championship Akhmat, a mixed martial arts promotion based in Russia.

List of events

ACA 104: Goncharov vs. Vakhaev

Absolute Championship Akhmat 104: Goncharov vs. Vakhaev was a mixed martial arts event held by Absolute Championship Akhmat on February 21, 2020, at the Basket-Hall in Krasnodar, Russia.

Background
An ACA Heavyweight Championship bout between current champion Evgeniy Goncharov and former champion Mukhumat Vakhaev served as the ACA 104 main event. The pairing were supposed to have met previously in March 2018 at ACA 94, but Vakhaev was unable to compete due to health problems.

Bonus awards:
 
The following fighters were awarded $10,000 bonuses:
Fight of the Night: Apti Bimarzaev vs. Alexey Polpudnikov 
Knockout of the Night: Artem Frolov
Submission of the Night: Maycon Silvan
$5000 Stoppage Victory Bonuses: Cleverson Silva, Bibert Tumenov, Ramazan Kishev, Mukhamed Kokov, Murad Zeynulabidov, Mukhumat Vakhaev

Results

ACA 105: Shakhbulatov vs. Oliveira 

Absolute Championship Akhmat 105: Shakhbulatov vs. Oliveira was a mixed martial arts event held by Absolute Championship Akhmat on March 6, 2020, at the Almaty Arena in Almaty, Kazakhstan.

Background
This event featured a title fight for the vacant ACA Bantamweight Championship between the Russian Shamil Shakhbulatov and the Brazilian Daniel Oliveira as headliner.

Bonus awards:
 
The following fighters were awarded $10,000 bonuses:
Fight of the Night: Daniel Oliveira  vs. Shamil Shakhbulatov  
Knockout of the Night: Asylzhan Bakhytzhanuly
Submission of the Night: Artem Reznikov
$5000 Stoppage Victory Bonuses: Abdul-Rahman Dzhanaev, Muslim Magomedov, Nursultan Kassymkhanov, Evgeniy Egemberdiev, Arman Ospanov

Results

ACA 106: Frolov vs. Magomedov

Absolute Championship Akhmat 106: Frolov vs. Magomedov was a mixed martial arts event held by Absolute Championship Akhmat. The event was initially scheduled to be held on March 24, 2020, at the Sibur Arena in Saint Petersburg, Russia, but it was postponed to July 11, 2020 due to the coronavirus outbreak.

Background
This event was headlined by former M-1 Middleweight Champion Artem Frolov and Ibragim Magomedov.

A welterweight bout between Magomedsaygid Alibekov and Georgiy Kichigin was scheduled for the co-main event of the evening. However, Kichigin was pulled from the event after testing positive for COVID-19. The welterweight bout between Andrey Koshkin and Mark Hulme was also scheduled for the main card, but Hulme was unable to compete due to visa issues. Alibekov and Koshkin faced each other in the co main event.

Bonus awards:
 
The following fighters were awarded $10,000 bonuses:
Fight of the Night: Bibert Tumenov vs. Alexander Matmuratov 
Knockout of the Night: Bekhruz Zukhurov
Submission of the Night: Egor Golubtsov
$5000 Stoppage Victory Bonuses: Alexey Efremov

Results

ACA 107: Emelianenko vs. Ismailov

Absolute Championship Akhmat 107: Emelianenko vs. Ismailov was a mixed martial arts event held by Absolute Championship Akhmat on July 24, 2020, in Sochi, Russia.

Background
The event was initially planned to be held on April 7, 2020, at the VTB Arena in Moscow, Russia, but was postponed to July 24 due to the coronavirus outbreak.

Kurban Taigibov was set to fight against Ramazan Kishev, but Kishev had to withdraw due to an injury. As a result of this, promotion officials rescheduled the bout for ACA 110 event September 5, 2020.

Alexey Shaposhnikov and Sheikh-Mansur Khabibulaev dropped out of the card due to injury. Their rivals Aren Hakobyan and Ruslan Abiltarov faced each other on the prelims card.

Bonus awards:
 
The following fighters were awarded $10,000 bonuses:
Fight of the Night: Nasrudin Nasrudinov vs. Evgeniy Egemberdiev 
Submission of the Night: Khaseyn Shaikhaev
$5000 Stoppage Victory Bonuses: Aren Akopyan, Magomed Bibulatov, Magomed Ismailov

Results

ACA 108: Galiev vs. Adaev

Absolute Championship Akhmat 108: Galiev vs. Adaev was a mixed martial arts event held by Absolute Championship Akhmat. The event was initially scheduled to be held on April 24, 2020, at the Arena COS Torwar in Warsaw, Poland, but due to the coronavirus outbreak it was postponed to August 8, 2020 in Russia.

Background

Bonus awards:
 
The following fighters will be awarded $10,000 bonuses:
Fight of the Night: Amirkhan Adaev vs. Vener Galiev 
Knockout of the Night: Alexander Butenko
Submission of the Night: Bayzet Khatkhokhu
$5000 Stoppage Victory Bonuses: Artur Astakhov, Alikhan Vakhaev

Results

ACA 109: Strus vs. Haratyk

Absolute Championship Akhmat 109: Strus vs. Haratyk was a mixed martial arts event held by Absolute Championship Akhmat on August 20, 2020, in Poland.

Background

Bonus awards:
 
The following fighters will be awarded $10,000 bonuses:
Fight of the Night: Karol Celiński vs. Luke Barnatt  
Knockout of the Night: Lom-Ali Eskijew 
$5000 Stoppage Victory Bonuses: Levan Makashvili, Dmitry Poberezhets, Nikola Dipchikov, Rafał Haratyk

Results

ACA 110: Bagov vs. Abdulaev

Absolute Championship Akhmat 110: Bagov vs. Abdulaev was be a mixed martial arts event held by Absolute Championship Akhmat on September 5, 2020, at the Krylatskoye Sports Palace in Moscow, Russia.

Background

Bonus awards:
 
The following fighters will be awarded $10,000 bonuses:
Fight of the Night: Islam Meshev vs. Emran Israfilov
Knockout of the Night: Askhab Zulaev
Submission of the Night: Samvel Vardanyan

Results

ACA 111: Abdulvakhabov vs. Sarnavskiy

Absolute Championship Akhmat 111: Abdulvakhabov vs. Sarnavskiy was a mixed martial arts event held by Absolute Championship Akhmat on September 19, 2020, at the Krylatskoye Sports Palace in Moscow, Russia.

Background

Bonus awards:
 
The following fighters were be awarded $10,000 bonuses:
Fight of the Night: Azam Gaforov vs. Mansur Khatuev
Knockout of the Night: Lom-Ali Nalgiev
$5000 Stoppage Victory Bonuses: Aleksei Butorin, Tural Ragimov, Azamat Amagov, Oleg Olenyechev, Murat Gugov

Results

ACA 112: Oliveira vs. Dudaev

Absolute Championship Akhmat 112: Oliveira vs. Dudaev was a mixed martial arts event held by Absolute Championship Akhmat on October 4, 2020, at the Sports Hall Coliseum  in Grozny, Russia.

Background

Bonus awards:
 
The following fighters were be awarded $10,000 bonuses:
Fight of the Night: Beslan Ushukov vs. Ustarmagomed Gadzhidaudov
Knockout of the Night: Magomed Bibulatov
$5000 Stoppage Victory Bonuses: Daniel Oliveira, Stanislav Vlasenko, Azamat Pshukov, Rasul Albaskhanov

Results

ACA 113: Kerefov vs. Gadzhiev

Absolute Championship Akhmat 113: Kerefov vs. Gadzhiev was a mixed martial arts event held by Absolute Championship Akhmat on November 6, 2020, at the VTB Arena  in Moscow, Russia.

Background
The main event of the evening was supposed to feature a title bout between the ACA Featherweight Champion Felipe Froes and the challenger Magomedrasul Khasbulaev, but it was reported that Khasbulaev has been forced out of the bout due to a leg injury. As a result, the fight was canceled. 

Bonus awards:
 
The following fighters will be awarded $10,000 bonuses:
Fight of the Night: Azamat Kerefov vs. Kurban Gadzhiev
Knockout of the Night: Shamil Shakhbulatov
Submission of the Night: Bayzet Khatkhokhu
$5000 Stoppage Victory Bonuses: Ruslan Abiltarov, Cristian Brinzan, Alexey Efremov, Oleg Borisov

Results

ACA 114: Omielańczuk vs. Johnson

Absolute Championship Akhmat 114: Omielańczuk vs. Johnson was a mixed martial arts event held by Absolute Championship Akhmat on November 26, 2020, at the DoubleTree by Hilton Hotel Lodz in Łódź, Poland.

Background
Vazha Tsiptauri was set to fight with Tomáš Deák but he has to withdraw a week before the fight when he tested positive for COVID-19. The Finns Mikael Silander replaces Tsiptauri, takes short notice fight against Deák.

Bonus awards:
 
The following fighters will be awarded $10,000 bonuses:   
Knockout of the Night: Kamil Oniszczuk
$5000 Stoppage Victory Bonuses: Mikael Silander, Adam Pałasz, Raul Tutarauli, Daniel James, Nikola Dipchikov, Tony Johnson Jr.

Results

ACA 115: Ismailov vs. Shtyrkov

Absolute Championship Akhmat 115: Ismailov vs. Shtyrkov was a mixed martial arts event held by Absolute Championship Akhmat on December 12, 2020, at the VTB Arena  in Moscow, Russia.

Background

Bonus awards:
 
The following fighters will be awarded $10,000 bonuses:
Fight of the Night: Dmitry Poberezhets vs. Ruslan Magomedov
Knockout of the Night: Evgeniy Egemberdiev
Submission of the Night: Alihan Suleimanov
$5000 Stoppage Victory Bonuses: Aren Akopyan, Bibert Tumenov, Andrey Goncharov

Results

ACA 116: Froes vs Balaev

Absolute Championship Akhmat 116: Froes vs Balaev was a mixed martial arts event held by Absolute Championship Akhmat on December 18, 2020, at the VTB Arena  in Moscow, Russia.

Background
ACA featherweight world champion Felipe Froes missed weight ahead of his fight against Marat Balaev and will not be eligible to retain the belt even if he wins. Felipe Froes was 0.7 kilograms over the limit. The fight will proceed with only Balaev, who weighed-in at 66 kg is eligible to win the title with a victory. If Froes wins the fight, the title will become vacant.

Brett Cooper was scheduled to face Beslan Isaev in a welterweight bout. However, after making weight, he consulted with his lawyers and decided to refuse fighting because of the U.S. Department of Treasury and Great Britain's sanctions policy against Kadyrov and any organization owned by him, this including Absolute Championship Akhmat. Under these sanctions, it is illegal for any US citizen to do business with any of these entities, meaning that all American fighters could face fines or jail time if they fight for the organization. 

Bonus awards:
 
The following fighters will be awarded $10,000 bonuses:
Fight of the Night: Ibragim Magomedov vs. Azamat Bekoev
Knockout of the Night: Roman Ogulchanskiy
Submission of the Night: Chersi Dudaev
$5000 Stoppage Victory Bonuses: Akhmed Musakaev, Mark Hulme, Grigor Matevosyan, Khuseyn Shaykhaev, Vener Galiev, Felipe Froes

Results

See also
 2020 in UFC
 2020 in Bellator MMA
 2020 in ONE Championship
2020 in Rizin Fighting Federation
2020 in Konfrontacja Sztuk Walki
 2020 in RXF

References

External links
ACA

Absolute Championship Akhmat
Absolute Championship Berkut events
2020 in mixed martial arts
2020 sport-related lists
February 2020 sports events in Russia